The Gadani Power Project (also known as Pakistan Power Park) was a proposed energy complex in Gadani, Balochistan, Pakistan, under the China-Pakistan Economic Corridor. In August 2013, the Pakistani government announced the establishment of ten coal power plants with a total capacity of 6,600 MW, with technical and financial assistance mostly from China. China would provide funds to cover 85% of the project cost, while the rest of the finances would be arranged by the government of Pakistan. The total cost of the project was PKR 144.6 billion.

Ten 660 MW coal-based power plants at Gadani Energy Park were to be constructed; China agreed to invest in six projects, two would be constructed by ANC Dubai, and one project was to be initiated by the government of Pakistan. Turkey's Ciner Group also agreed to start work on a 660 MW coal power plant at Gadani.

In May 2017, the project was officially cancelled by the governments of Pakistan and China.

References

Proposed power stations in Pakistan
China–Pakistan Economic Corridor
Energy in Balochistan, Pakistan